Pick of the Litter is a best-of compilation album by the Scottish Celtic rock group Wolfstone.  It was released in 1997.

Track listing 
 "Battle" - 3:30
The Battle of the Somme
The Bugle Horn
The Atholl Highlanders
 "Tall Ships" - 4:54
 "Glass and the Can" - 4:31
 "Cleveland Park" - 4:09
Cleveland Park
The Banks of the Allan
Kenny Gillies of Portnalong, Skye
 "Heart and Soul" - 3:15
 "The Howl" - 7:27
The Louis Reel
Morrison's Jig
The Shoe Polisher's Jig
 "White Gown" - 4:20
 "Glenglass" - 5:26
 "Brave Foot Soldiers" - 4:46
 "Dinner's Set" - 4:13
Dinner's Dangerous River Jacket
Richard Dwyer's Reel
Sandy MacLeod of Garafad
 "Sleepy Toon" - 3:47
 "The £10 Float" - 5:10
Kinnaird House
The £10 Float
The Cottage in the Grove
 "Holy Ground" - 3:49
 "Clueless" - 3:56
Clueless
Fleshmarket Close
The Steampacket
 "No Tie Ups" - 4:07

1997 greatest hits albums
Wolfstone albums